Mönkh Saridag (also spelled as Munku-Sardyk; Mongolian: Мөнх сарьдаг, lit. "eternal aiguille") is the highest mountain in the Sayan Mountains of Asia. It is also the highest mountain in Buryatia and the highest mountain in Mongolia's Khövsgöl Province. On the southern side, the tree line is at 2000 meters, on the northern side at 2200 meters.

See also
 List of highest points of Russian federal subjects
 List of Ultras of Central Asia
 List of mountains in Mongolia

References

Sources
 M. Nyamaa, Khövsgöl aimgiin lavlakh toli, Ulaanbaatar 2001, p. 37

External links

 "Gora Munku-Sardyk, Mongolia/Russia" on Peakbagger

Mountains of Mongolia
Mountains of Russia
Mountains of Buryatia
International mountains of Asia
Mongolia–Russia border
Khövsgöl Province
Highest points of Russian federal subjects
Sayan Mountains